Matías Fernando Soto de Freitas (born 23 April 1991) is a Uruguayan professional footballer who plays as a right back for Rampla Juniors.

National
He has been capped by the Uruguay national under-20 football team for the Copa Aerosur.

International goals

|- 
| 1. || 10 September 2010 || Estadio Municipal de La Pintana, Santiago, Chile ||  || 2–3 || 2–3 || Friendly ||
|}

References

External links

1991 births
Living people
Uruguayan footballers
Uruguayan expatriate footballers
Uruguay under-20 international footballers
Defensor Sporting players
Juventud de Las Piedras players
Rampla Juniors players
Santa Tecla F.C. footballers
Real C.D. España players
Uruguayan Primera División players
Association football defenders
Uruguayan expatriate sportspeople in El Salvador
Uruguayan expatriate sportspeople in Honduras
Expatriate footballers in El Salvador
Expatriate footballers in Honduras